Ioannis (Giannis) Lagos (born 7 September 1972) is a Greek politician currently serving as a Member of the European Parliament and one of the founders of Greek nationalist political party and criminal organization Golden Dawn.

On 7 October 2020, he was found guilty of running Golden Dawn, and a number of other serious offences, including orchestrating the fatal stabbing of Pavlos Fyssas and many violent attacks on migrants and left-wing political opponents. Subsequently, he was sentenced to 13 years in jail.

Political career 
He has served for a number of years as a member of the Hellenic Parliament for the criminal gang and neo-Nazi party Golden Dawn between 2012 and 2019, and was elected to the European Parliament on the party's ticket before announcing that he would sit as an independent a few days after being sworn in as an MEP on 2 July 2019. He and other former Golden Dawn MPs and members founded a splinter party on 9 November 2019.

On 2 March 2022, he was one of 13 MEPs who voted against condemning the Russian invasion of Ukraine.

Anti-Turkish notions 
In January 2020, Lagos tore down the flag of Turkey during a speech at the European Parliament on illegal migration, accusing Turkey of sending illegal immigrants to Greece. The action received criticism from Turkish and Greek officials, including Turkish Minister of Foreign Affairs Mevlüt Çavuşoğlu and the Greek Ministry of Foreign Affairs. He was later penalised by the European Parliament for his actions.

Criminal activities 
His actions with Golden Dawn have twice led to his arrest and detention on charges of forming a criminal organization, while he is also allegedly involved in the murder of Pavlos Fyssas, which led to his conviction, along with many other members, on October 7, 2020 as one of the leaders of the criminal gang.

On September 13, 2019, he was sentenced to another eight months in jail with suspension for the attack on the social space "Συνεργείο" in 2013 and an extra 13 years in October 2020 for leading a criminal organisation, resulting in a prison sentence of 13 years.

On October 19, 2020 Greek authorities submitted a request to the European Parliament to have Giannis Lagos' parliamentary immunity lifted in order to prosecute him.
The immunity has been removed on April 27, 2021 opening to his extradition to Greece.

References

Living people
MEPs for Greece 2019–2024
Golden Dawn (political party) MEPs
Golden Dawn (political party) politicians
1972 births
Greek politicians convicted of crimes
Politicians from Piraeus